On 16 August 2018, a Boeing 737-800 operating as XiamenAir Flight 8667 skidded off the runway at Ninoy Aquino International Airport in Metro Manila while attempting to land in poor weather conditions. The crash occurred at 11:55 pm (UTC+8) after a two and a half hour flight from Xiamen.

While the crash neither had fatalities nor injuries, numerous flights at Ninoy Aquino International Airport were suspended. The runway 06/24 was closed from the time of the incident until 05:00 am on 18 August 2018 (UTC +08). One of the aircraft's engine was torn off by the impact.

The flight crew operating the flight are quoted as saying that the torrential downpour obstructed visual navigation to the runway on final approach. However, transcripts between the air traffic controller and the crew did not indicate anything unusual.

The accident was probed by the Senate of the Philippines through its Senate Committee on Public Services which was headed by Senator Grace Poe. The hearing, attended by XiamenAir officials, took place on 29 August 2018.

Accident 
The aircraft involved in the accident was a Boeing 737-800, registration B-5498 with Manufacturer Serial Number 37574 and line number 3160. It was powered by 2 CFM International CFM56 turbofan engines and first flew on 14 January 2010.

The accident occurred at around 23:55 Philippine Standard Time (UTC+08:00) when the aircraft was on approach for Ninoy Aquino International Airport for the second time. The crew had aborted a landing attempt on runway 24 fifteen minutes prior. They lost contact with the control tower on the second approach.

At the time of the second attempt, there was a strong thunderstorm with strong winds and poor visibility. The aircraft skidded off the left edge of the runway and stopped on the soft ground with the left main landing gear and the left engine being separated from the main fuselage. The aircraft was written off as the result of the accident.

The 157 passengers and 8 crew on board were evacuated on the evacuation slides with no injuries or deaths being reported.

Two minutes after the accident, the airport's Emergency Plan No.1 was immediately put into effect, with all of its available fire trucks being dispatched to the crash site. This was followed by the airport police and the medical team to attend the injured.

The aircraft was positioned approximately 80 meters from the center point of the runway, about 70 meters short of the safety guidelines set by the International Civil Aviation Organization for the continued use of the airstrip, meaning that the runway was closed until the aircraft and its debris was removed from the runway. This caused the cancellations of around 280 flights with flight scheduled to land rerouted to Clark International Airport and other nearby airports.

At 2:10 Philippine Standard Time, the Civil Aviation Authority of the Philippines (CAAP) arrived to gather evidence and remove the aircraft's black box, which took 4 hours. After this, the airport removed the aircraft from the runway using a telescoping crane. The process of removing the plane took around 26 hours.
 the damaged aircraft remains on an apron at NAIA with the cockpit and forward quarter of the fuselage covered by a tarpaulin. The aircraft is leaning to one side on its belly with an engine missing.

Investigation 
The accident was investigated by the Aircraft Accident Investigation and Inquiry Board (AAIIB) of the Civil Aviation Authority of the Philippines (CAAP). Along with the Flight Safety Investigation Committee(FSIC) to determine the possible civil air regulation violations of XiamenAir. The Philippine House Committee on Transportation also conducted their own independent investigation on the accident.

The aircraft's black box was sent to Singapore for decoding, the AAIIB said that the aircraft's black box was of good quality but also stated that due to the Philippine aviation rules, they are prevented from revealing the contents until after the final report is submitted to authorities.

The AAIIB and CAAP also interviewed the pilots, investigated the crew and checked the service records of the aircraft as part of their investigation.

See also 

List of accidents and incidents involving the Boeing 737
List of accidents and incidents involving commercial aircraft
TAM Flight 3054

References

2018 disasters in the Philippines
Aviation accidents and incidents involving runway excursions
Aviation accidents and incidents in 2018
Aviation accidents and incidents in the Philippines
Accidents and incidents involving the Boeing 737 Next Generation
XiamenAir accidents and incidents
August 2018 events in the Philippines